Hedy Stenuf Byram (July 18, 1922 – November 7, 2010) was an Austrian figure skater who later competed for France and the United States. Representing the United States, she became a two-time World medalist.

Life and career 
Stenuf first became known in the United States in 1934, when as an eleven-year-old she accompanied the Austrian champion Karl Schäfer on an exhibition tour in North America. The following season, she began appearing at major international competitions, placing 7th at the 1935 European Championships and fourth at the 1935 World Championships, which were held in her hometown of Vienna. She was considered a strong challenger to reigning champion Sonja Henie.

At the 1936 Winter Olympic, Stenuf finished sixth in the singles competition.

Later in 1936 and 1937, she switched to competing for France, and then in 1938, to the United States. She won bronze and silver medals at the World Championships in 1938 and 1939, respectively. In addition to her accomplishments in single skating, she also competed in pair skating with partner Skippy Baxter; the pair won silver at the 1940 U.S. Figure Skating Championships.

Stenuf's married surname was Byram.

Competitive highlights

Ladies' singles

Pairs with Baxter

References

 Skatabase
 U.S. Figure Skating media guide

1922 births
2010 deaths
Austrian emigrants to the United States
Austrian female single skaters
French female single skaters
American female single skaters
Olympic figure skaters of Austria
Figure skaters at the 1936 Winter Olympics
World Figure Skating Championships medalists
Figure skaters from Vienna
21st-century American women